Kondaiah or Kondayya (Telugu: కొండయ్య) is one of the Indian names.

 Challa Kondaiah, Chief Justice of Andhra Pradesh High Court
 K. C. Kondaiah, MLC, Bellary, ex-MP (Lok Sabha & Rajya Sabha)